Naydene Smith (born 27 August 1987, in Pretoria) is a South African rower. At the 2012 Summer Olympics, she competed in the Women's coxless pair with Lee-Ann Persse. Outside of rowing, she enjoys swimming and sewing.

References

Living people
South African female rowers
South African people of British descent
Olympic rowers of South Africa
Rowers at the 2012 Summer Olympics
1987 births
People from Pretoria